{
  "type": "ExternalData",
  "service": "page",
  "title": "West and East Jersey Dividing Lines.map"
}
The Quintipartite Deed was a legal document that split the Province of New Jersey, dividing it into the Province of West Jersey and the Province of East Jersey from 1674 until 1702.

On July 1, 1676, William Penn, Gawen Lawrie (who served from 1683 to 1686 as Deputy to Governor Robert Barclay), Nicholas Lucas, and Edward Byllynge executed a deed with Sir George Carteret known as the “Quintipartite Deed,” in which the territory was divided into two parts, East Jersey being taken by Carteret and West Jersey by Byllynge and his trustees.

Almost as soon as the Deed was signed, disputes arose over the exact dividing point of the two provinces. The first attempt at resolving the issue, the Keith line, was created by Surveyor-General George Keith in 1686, and runs North-Northwest from the southern part of Little Egg Harbor, passing just north of Tuckerton, and reaching upward to a point on the Delaware River which is just north of the Delaware Water Gap.

More accurate surveys and maps were made to further resolve property disputes. This resulted in the Thornton line, drawn around 1696, and the Lawrence line, drawn around 1743, which was adopted as the final line for legal purposes.

Remnants of the most operative line Keith Line can still be seen in the county boundaries between Burlington and Ocean and between Hunterdon and Somerset, as well as in a number of municipal boundaries within Mercer and Ocean counties, and the alignment of Province Line Road in Mercer County.

See also
New York – New Jersey Line War

References

External links
Council of Proprietors of West Jersey – Origin and History
New jersey Pinelands on article on the division of East and West Jersey
Where was the West Jersey/East Jersey line?

Pre-statehood history of New Jersey
Legal documents
1676 in law
Borders of New Jersey